Eagle Bay is a small town in Western Australia's South West region near Dunsborough, in the local government area of the City of Busselton. At the 2021 census, it had a population of 120. It is known for its luxury holiday homes, with an occupancy rate on the night of the 2021 census of about 13%.

On 30 May 1801, a landing party from the Baudin expedition unsuccessfully looked for water at Eagle Bay; this event is commemorated by the Baudin memorial, which was unveiled in 2001. In the late 19th century Stewart Keenan, who had a farm in the local area, built a track connecting his Eagle Bay farm to the timber mill community at Yelverton. In the 1950s, there was a commercial salmon fishery in Eagle Bay. The modern-day settlement began to develop in the early 1970s. Eagle Bay contains a residents' association (established 1990), a volunteer fire brigade, and a community hall (constructed in 2014). The eponymous bay is in Meelup Regional Park.

References

Coastal towns in Western Australia
Capes region of South West Western Australia